Marko Nestorović (born 15 July 1984) is a Serbian football midfielder who plays for Dinamo Vranje.

References

External links
 
 

1984 births
Living people
Footballers from Belgrade
Association football midfielders
Serbian footballers
Serbian expatriate footballers
Serbian expatriate sportspeople in Albania
Serbian expatriate sportspeople in North Macedonia
Serbian expatriate sportspeople in Bosnia and Herzegovina
Expatriate footballers in Albania
Expatriate footballers in North Macedonia
Expatriate footballers in Bosnia and Herzegovina
FK Bežanija players
FK BASK players
FK Palilulac Beograd players
FK Sileks players
NK Čelik Zenica players
FK Dinamo Vranje players
Kategoria Superiore players